André Tridon Jagendorf (October 21, 1926 – March 13, 2017) was an American Liberty Hyde Bailey Professor Emeritus in the Section of Plant Biology at Cornell University who is notable for providing direct evidence that chloroplasts synthesize adenosine triphosphate (ATP) using the chemiosmotic mechanism proposed by Peter Mitchell.

Personal life
André Tridon Jagendorf was born on October 21, 1926 in New York City to Moritz Adolph Jagendorf and Sophie Sheba (Sokolsky) Jagendorf. He married Jean Elizabeth Whitenack on June 12, 1952. They had three children Suzanne, Judith and Daniel (deceased January 2014); 8 grandchildren; and 9 great grandchildren. André Jagendorf died on March 13, 2017.

University life

André Jagendorf graduated from Cornell University where he was strongly influenced by Loren Petry who taught General Botany. He earned his PhD in 1951 at Yale University under David Bonner. André then went to UCLA, where he was awarded a Merck Postdoctoral fellowship and spent what he called "the happiest years of my life" working with Sam Wildman. Jagendorf became an Assistant professor at Johns Hopkins University in 1953, as Associate professor in 1958, and a Full professor in 1966. Jagendorf then returned to Cornell University as Professor of Plant Physiology, and in 1981 became the Liberty Hyde Baily Professor. Since 1997 Jagendorf has been the Liberty Hyde Bailey Professor Emeritus in the Department of Plant Biology and was actively doing research and mentoring young scientists until days before his death.

Research

Jagendorf heard Peter Mitchell give a talk about chemiosmosis at a bioenergetics meeting in Sweden. According to Jagendorf, "His words went into one of my ears and out the other, leaving me feeling annoyed they had allowed such a ridiculous and incomprehensible speaker in. But – Geoffrey [Hind] read Nature. Geoffrey was from England, both better trained and more intelligent than I was. He read Peter Mitchell’s paper, came to me, and said ‘André, could this possibly explain XE [something that preceded ATP formation]?’"

As a result of this conversation, Jagendorf began to communicate with Peter Mitchell who invited him to visit his lab so that he could learn about the chemiosmotic hypothesis. Later that summer Jagendorf did the experimentum crucis that showed that the synthesis of adenosine trisphosphate by chloroplasts depended on the magnitude of the pH difference.

The experiment consisted of creating a pH gradient across the thylakoid membrane of chloroplasts in the dark. Jagendorf and Uribe created the transient pH gradient by incubating chloroplasts in a pH 4 buffer for 15 seconds. They then placed the chloroplasts in a pH 8 buffer that contained ADP and Pi. Under these conditions, the pH of the stroma increased to 8, whereas the pH of the thylakoid lumen remained at 4. An immediate increase in ATP synthesis accompanied the dissipation of the pH gradient across the thylakoid membrane. According to Berg et al. "This incisive experiment was one of the first to unequivocally support the hypothesis put forth by Peter Mitchell that ATP synthesis is driven by proton-motive force." Following Jagendorf's results, Mitchell wrote a letter to Edward C. Slater on November 2, 1965, stating: "experiments have been steadily pushing me towards accepting the chemiosmotic hypothesis and I think I shall feel inclined presently to regard it as a theory."

Jagendorf was also a pioneer in many aspects of chloroplast molecular biology, including DNA repair mechanisms.

Honors and awards

Jagendorf became the President of the American Society of Plant Physiologists in 1967. He received the Charles F. Kettering Award of the American Society of Plant Physiologists in 1978. Jagendorf was elected to the National Academy of Sciences in 1980. Jagendorf received the Charles Reid Barnes Life Membership Award of the American Society of Plant Physiologists in 1989 and received the 2012 Rebeiz Foundation for Basic Research Life Time Achievement Award for his contributions to the understanding of ATP Biosynthesis. At the award presentation, Govindjee, Tom Sharkey and Richard McCarthy gave testimonials. According to Tom Sharkey, 

Jagendorf has been recognized as a Pioneer Member of the American Society of Plant Biologists.

Podcasts 
On September 8, 2016 André discussed his life journey with colleague, Robert Turgeon, a professor in the Plant Biology Section.

Jokes
Jagendorf is famous for his jokes and gave a stellar performance at the retirement party for Peter J. Davies on June 18, 2016.

References

External links
Obituary in Ithaca Journal
Obituary at Legacy.com
André Jagendorf, Pioneering Plant Biologist, Dies at 90
André Tridon Jagendorf (1926–2017): a personal tribute by Govindjee in Photosynthesis Research (2017)

1926 births
2017 deaths
Cornell University alumni
Cornell University faculty
Yale University alumni
Members of the United States National Academy of Sciences